Sport Club Corinthians Paulista Superleague Formula team is the racing team of Sport Club Corinthians Paulista, a football team that competes in Brazil in the Série A. The Corinthians racing team competes in the Superleague Formula. It was operated by EuroInternational during the first season, and it will be operated by Alan Docking Racing during the second season.

2008 season
In the 2008 Superleague Formula season Corinthians finished overall in the 9th position. The car was drove in the first two round by Andy Soucek, and in the rest of the season by Antônio Pizzonia.

2009 season
For the 2009 Superleague Formula season, Antônio Pizzonia has been confirmed as the driver.

Record
(key)

2008

2009
Super Final results in 2009 did not count for points towards the main championship.

2010

References

External links
 SC Corinthians Superleague Formula team minisite
 Official SC Corinthians football club website

Sport Club Corinthians Paulista
Superleague Formula club teams
2008 establishments in Brazil